The Viyyur High Security Prison is a high tech, high-security prison situated in Viyyur, Thrissur city, Kerala, India. Half  of the prison will be located underground to resist aerial attack. The prison can accommodate 300 people.

History and facilities
Kerala Chief Minister Oommen Chandy laid the foundation stone for the first high security prison on 17 June 2011 at Viyyur, Thrissur City. The prison would be constructed in a 10-acre plot adjacent to Central Prison, Viyyur at an expense of 20 crore and is expected to be completed in two years. The prison will have two compound walls, six-layered security scanning for visitors and CCTV in every cell, double-layer peripheral wall, five watch towers, a hi-tech video conference hall for trials, two hydraulic gates, single cells for solitary confinements and a hospital with mini-operation facility. A 250 sq ft lawn would be developed surrounding the prison wall to avoid hand grenade attacks and personnel with a technical background would be deployed at the new facility.

References

Prisons in Kerala
2016 establishments in Kerala
Law enforcement in Kerala
Buildings and structures in Thrissur